The University of Finance and Economics (abbreviated UFE) is one of the largest educational institutions of Mongolia. The University is on the banks of Selbe river at the heart of Ulaanbaatar city. The University offers bachelor's and master's programs since the liberalisation period of the 1990s. Formerly known as the Institute of Finance and Economics (or IFE), the institution was granted university status in 2016.

History
Originally founded on June 3, 1924 as the School of Custom's Officers in Ulaanbaatar, it is one of the oldest continuously operating educational institutions in the country. In 1931 it changed its name to School of Accounting, adding more subjects. In 1946, shortly after the World War II, its name was changed again to College of Finance and Economics, and the school extended its curriculum to most of the current spectrum.

The institution became the Institute of Finance and Economics on August 16, 1991, and postgraduate courses were introduced. Subjects included business administration, financial management, accounting and bookkeeping.

The University of Finance and Economics of Mongolia is one of the first accredited universities by Accreditation Council for Business Schools and Programs in 2012.

Faculties
The university is divided into a number of faculties:

Department of English Language Study
Department of Financial Management
Department of Business Administration
Department of Applied Mathematics and Statistics
Department of Humanities
Department of Economics
Department of Information System Management

Notable alumni
Yumjaagiin Tsedenbal, General Secretary of the Central Committee of the Mongolian People's Revolutionary Party of Mongolia (1974-1984)
Jigjidiin Mönkhbat, 1968 Summer Olympics silver medalist in men's freestyle middleweight wrestling
Battsetseg Batmunkh, Minister of Foreign Affairs (2021-),General Secretary of the Mongolian People's Party (2010-2012)

Student Union
The UFE has a Student Union formed by students. Financially supported by the school administration, the Union organizes socio-cultural activities as well as extracurricular academics activities.

The earlier structure of the Union was the Student Council which was relatively small, founded in 1997. Until 2001 there was no stability in student organization activity. In 2001, the Student Council changed its name to Student Union and started to expand. On April 10, 2004, the Student Union changed its name to back to Student Council. The reason for this change is uncertain. The latest change of its name occurred on October 1, 2007: the Student Council changed its status to a non-government organization hence called Student Union.

The Student Union is governed by the Student Assembly, although day-to-day workings of the Union are handled by the Executive Committee. Representatives for the Student Assembly, the Chair's Office are elected/appointed between October and November each academic year.

External links
 Official website

References

Universities in Mongolia
Ulaanbaatar
1924 establishments in Mongolia
Educational institutions established in 1924